Nebacumab is a human monoclonal antibody developed for the treatment of sepsis. It has been withdrawn in 1993 because it failed to reduce mortality in clinical trials.

References 

Monoclonal antibodies
Withdrawn drugs
Abandoned drugs